"Feel Inside (And Stuff Like That)" is a 2012 charity single and comedy song by New Zealand comedy duo Flight of the Conchords. The Conchords are joined by a charity supergroup made up of New Zealand singers. Proceeds of the song benefited the New Zealand children's health research charity Cure Kids. The song debuted at number one on the New Zealand Top 40.

Background
The project was created and produced by Brooke Howard-Smith and Jesse Griffin and was written by Jemaine Clement, Bret McKenzie, and American producers Printz Board and Sleep as part of TV3's charity special Red Nose Day: Comedy for Cure Kids. In writing the song, Clement and McKenzie interviewed a group of 5- and 6-year-old children from Clyde Quay School in Wellington and Grey Lynn School in Auckland, asking them about sick children and charity fundraising. The Conchords used the children's often nonsensical responses to build the lyrics of the song. As well as serving as a bona fide charity single, the song also parodies the charity supergroup songs of the 1980s, such as "Do They Know It's Christmas?".

Featured singers
In order of appearance:

 Flight of the Conchords 
 Brooke Fraser
 Dave Dobbyn
 Savage
 Boh Runga
 Sam Scott and Luke Buda

 Ruby Frost
 Zowie
 Rikki Morris
 Nathan King
 Victoria Girling-Butcher
 Peter Urlich

 Elizabeth Marvelly
 Cherie Mathieson
 Massad
 Moana Maniapoto
 Young Sid, PNC, Tyree, Deach
 Kids of 88

Charts

References

External links
 
 

2012 singles
2012 songs
Flight of the Conchords songs
Charity singles
Number-one singles in New Zealand
Songs written by Bret McKenzie
Songs written by Jemaine Clement